İsmail Hakkı Akansel (1924 – 15 May 2016) was a Turkish military general and politician. In 1980, Akansel was appointed Mayor of Istanbul  following the 1980 Turkish coup d'état and the establishment of military rule in Turkey. He served as the Mayor of Istanbul from September 1980 to August 1981.

He retired from the military in 1985.

İsmail Hakki Akansel died in Izmir, Turkey on 15 May 2016 at the age of 92. He was buried in Istanbul.

References

1924 births
2016 deaths
Date of birth missing
Mayors of Istanbul
Turkish Army generals
Military personnel from Istanbul
People from Erzincan